Glossochelys is an extinct genus of sea turtles from the Pancheloniidae that has been discovered in Eocene (Ypresian) deposits in Harwich, England (London Clay Formation) that was first described as a species of Lytoloma in 1842. The type species, G. planimentum, was described as a separate species in 1871 by Harry Seeley. It was possibly the same animal as Euclastes or Erquelinnesia.

References

Chelonioidea
Prehistoric turtle genera
Ypresian genus first appearances
Eocene genus extinctions
Eocene turtles
Eocene reptiles of Europe
Fossils of England
Fossil taxa described in 1871